Below are the squads for the men's football tournament at the 1998 Asian Games, played in Bangkok, Thailand.

Group A

South Korea
Coach: Huh Jung-moo

Turkmenistan
Coach:  Viktor Pozhechevskyi

Vietnam
Coach:  Alfred Riedl

Group B

Cambodia
Coach:  Joachim Fickert

China
Coach:  Bob Houghton

Lebanon
Coach:  Mahmoud Saad

Group C

India
Coach: Syed Nayeemuddin

Japan
Coach:  Philippe Troussier

Nepal
Coach:  Yoo Kee-heung

Group D

Maldives
Coach:  Vyacheslav Solokho

Qatar

Tajikistan
Coach: Zoir Babaev

Group E

North Korea
Coach: An Se-uk

United Arab Emirates
Coach:  Carlos Queiroz

Group F

Hong Kong
Coach:  Sebastião Araújo

Oman
Coach:  Valdeir Vieira

Thailand
Coach:  Peter Withe

Group G

Kuwait
Coach:  Milan Máčala

Mongolia
Coach: Lkhamsürengiin Dorjsüren

Uzbekistan
Coach:  Ubirajara Veiga

Group H

Iran
Coach: Mansour Pourheidari

Kazakhstan
Coach: Sergey Gorokhovadatskiy

Laos

References

External links
RSSSF Link 1
RSSSF Link 2
RSSSF Link 3

1998
Squads